The Association of Norwegian Architects (NAL) is a country-wide Norwegian organization for graduate architects. Established in 1911, as of 2015 the organization had some 4,100 members. In addition to its central office in Oslo, it has 14 regional branches. Its president is Alexandria Algard.

The NAL strives to improve conditions for the profession of architecture. It publishes two periodicals: Arkitektur N and Arkitektnytt.

References

External links
Official site

Architecture in Norway
1911 establishments in Norway
Professional associations based in Norway
Organisations based in Oslo
Architecture-related professional associations